Sapozhkovsky District is an administrative and municipal district (raion), one of the twenty-five in Ryazan Oblast, Russia. It is located in the southern central part of the oblast. Its administrative center is the urban locality (a work settlement) of Sapozhok. Population: 10,901 (2010 Census);  The population of Sapozhok accounts for 35.6% of the district's total population.

References

Notes

Sources

Districts of Ryazan Oblast